Qualitative properties are properties that are observed and can generally not be measured with a numerical result. They are contrasted to quantitative properties which have numerical characteristics.

Some engineering and scientific properties are qualitative. A test method can result in qualitative data about something. This can be a categorical result or a binary classification (e.g., pass/fail, go/no go, conform/non-conform). It can sometimes be an engineering judgement.

The data that all share a qualitative property form a nominal category. A variable which codes for the presence or absence of such a property is called a binary categorical variable, or equivalently a dummy variable.

In businesses
Some important qualitative properties that concern businesses are:

Human factors, 'human work capital' is probably one of the most important issues that deals with qualitative properties. Some common aspects are work, motivation, general participation, etc. Although all of these aspects are not measurable in terms of quantitative criteria, the general overview of them could be summarized as a quantitative property.

Environmental issues are in some cases quantitatively measurable, but other properties are qualitative e.g.: environmentally friendly manufacturing, responsibility for the entire life of a product (from the raw-material till scrap), attitudes towards safety, efficiency, and minimum waste production.

Ethical issues are closely related to environmental and human issues, and may be covered in corporate governance. Child labour and illegal dumping of waste are examples of ethical issues.

The way a company deals with its stockholders (the 'acting' of a company) is probably the most obvious qualitative aspect of a business. Although measuring something in qualitative terms is difficult, most people can (and will) make a judgement about a behaviour on the basis of how they feel treated. This indicates that qualitative properties are closely related to emotional impressions.

See also
Categorical variable
Level of measurement
Qualitative research
Quantitative research
Statistical data type

References

Measurement
Mathematical terminology